2018 T10 League was the second season of the T10 League. The matches had a 10-over-a-side format with a time duration of 90 minutes. The tournament was played as a round robin followed by semifinals and the final. It was played from 21 November to 2 December 2018 at the Sharjah Cricket Stadium. Three new teams, Sindhis, Rajputs and Northern Warriors, joined the tournament with the exclusion of Team Sri Lanka from last season.

Before the start of the tournament, Karachians changed their name to Sindhis after a Pakistan court order had objected to their title, citing a clash of identity with the Pakistan Super League team Karachi Kings.

Squads

Group stage

Group A

Group B

Super league

 Advanced to Qualifier final Advanced to Eliminator finals 1

Playoffs

Qualifier final

Eliminator finals
Eliminator final 1

Eliminator final 2

3rd place playoff

Final

References

External links
 Series home at ESPN Cricinfo

2018 in Emirati cricket
Abu Dhabi T10 League